Chester Opera House was a cinema and theatre which showed both movies and live stage performances in Chester, Illinois, USA. Elzie Segar, the creator of Popeye, worked there from the age of twelve. The Chester Opera House was built in the late 19th century. It was converted to a movie house about 1920 by its owner, Bill Schuchert. Now closed as a movie theater, the old Opera House now houses a Popeye-themed gift shop and museum.

References

Cinemas and movie theaters in Illinois
Buildings and structures in Randolph County, Illinois